Bang Kaeo may refer to:
 Thai Bangkaew Dog, a dog breed
 Bang Kaeo (town), town in Samut Prakan Province
 Bang Kaeo District, Phatthalung Province